Gerhard Gepp (born 1940) is an Austrian Illustrator, Painter and Graphic designer.

Life
Gepp was born in 1940 on the western edge of Vienna in Pressbaum where he still lives and works.

His initial training was in Offset printing. As an artist, he is self-taught. Between 1964 and 1976, he worked as a Graphic designer and Illustrator.

He received prizes for various pieces of work such as the "Poster Prize" from the City of Vienna and the Milanese "Rizzoli-Preis".   His first publications in various professional journals in Germany and Switzerland followed.   At the same time Gepp worked at advertising photography and staged his own exhibition in the Vienna gallery "Die Brücke".   In 1976 he also started to produce hand-coloured etchings.   From 1976 he was working on drawings, gouachea and oil paintings which were exhibited in Vienna at the BAWAG-Foundation.   Further exhibitions in Austria and Germany followed and at art fairs in Basel, Cologne and Ghent.

Since 1989, his illustrations have focused increasingly on "political satire".   Working with acrylic on cardboard and/or canvas he has continued to receive prizes at exhibitions.   His illustrations frequently appear in German language and international publications.

In 2001 the Austrian "professional" Professor title was conferred on Gepp.

Illustrations in newspapers and journals  
Gerhard Gepp has had numerous print media contracts.  These have included daily papers such as Der Standard, Die Presse and the Wiener Zeitung in Austria as well as the Süddeutsche Zeitung and Die Zeit in Germany.

Magazine contracts have included the Austrian economic monthly Trend, the German popular Psychology monthly Psychologie Heute (Psychology Today) and Switzerland's satirical monthly Nebelspalter (literally "Fog cleaver").

In addition, Gepp produced a large number of illustrations and title images for the "Wiener Journal" founded in 1980 by Jörg Mauthe (and sold in 2004 to the Wiener Zeitung).

 Gerhard Gepp awards and prizes
 1983  Staatspreis für Werbung, Girozentrale / IMT Wien
 1990  Intern.Cartoonfestival Budapest/H,  3rd prize
 1991  Satyrykon, Legnica/PL,  Special prize
 1992  IWA-Foundation, Havirov/CZ, 3rd prize; Velocartoon, Siauliai/LIT, 1st prize      
 1993  Satyrykon, Legnica/PL, 3rd prize
 1994  Österr.Kinder-und Jugendbuch-Illustrationspreis 1994; CHildren/youth prize from the City of Vienna 1994
 1996  Satyrykon, Legnica/PL, Special prize
 1997  The Golden Smile, Belgrad/YU, 2.Preis;  Satyrykon, Legnica/PL, 3rd prize
 1998  12.Dutch Catoonfestival, Eindhofen/NL, Spezialpreis; Satyrykon, Legnica/PL, 3rd prize
 1999  2o.Biennale Intern.dell´Umorismo nell´Arte, Tolentino/I, Spezialpreis; Satyrykon, Legnica/PL, Special prize
 2001  Intern. Forum of Visual Humour, Surgut/RUS, Special prize
 2002  Satyrykon, Legnica/PL, 1st prize
 2003  Eurohumor, Borgo San Dalmazzo/ I, Special prize, Satyrykon, Legnica / PL, 3rd prize      
 2004  Swiss Cartoon Award, CH, Spezialpreis; Humorest, Hradec Králové/CZ, 3rd prize
 2006  „Alles Wein“, Literatur & Karikatur, Krems/A, 2.Preis; Satyrykon, Legnica/PL, Grand Prix
 2008  Hans Langitz-Gedächtnispreis für Karikatur, Klagenfurt/A; Aydin Dogan XXV Intern.Cartoon Comp., Istanbul/TR, 3rd prize
 2012  Karikaturmuseum Warschau, Intern. Competition "The ball is in play" 1st prize

Books 
 Werner Fiala, Gerhard Gepp: Manifest in Wort und Bild. Bibliothek der Provinz, 2010, 
 Irene Ulitzka, Gerhard Gepp: Das Land der Ecken. Picus Verlag, 1994, (Österr. Kinder- und Jugendbuchpreis 1994, Kinder- und Jugendbuchpreis der Stadt Wien, 1994)
 Gerhard Gepp: Kleines Boot auf Grosser Reise. Picus Verlag, 1995,

External links

References

Austrian painters
Austrian male painters
1940 births
Living people